Kvačany is a village and municipality in Liptovský Mikuláš District in the Žilina Region of northern Slovakia.

History
In historical records the village was first mentioned in 1286.

Geography
The municipality lies at an altitude of 610 metres (2001 ft) and covers an area of 22.435 km² (13.94 mi). It has a population of about 560 people.

External links
https://web.archive.org/web/20070513023228/http://www.statistics.sk/mosmis/eng/run.html
 Village website (in Slovak)

Villages and municipalities in Liptovský Mikuláš District